The High Taunus is the name of a major natural region unit (no. 301) in the Hessian Central Uplands range of the Taunus mountains and forms the area immediately around the main ridge of the Taunus. It should not be confused with the term Hochtaunus, in the sense used in the name of the county of Hochtaunuskreis which is only the eastern part of the Feldberg massif. The High Taunus separates the Anterior Taunus in the south from the Lower Taunus in the north and includes the majority of the highest mountains and hills of the Taunus. The eastern part of the natural region lies within the Taunus Nature Park and its western part in the Rhine-Taunus Nature Park.

Location 
The High Taunus runs as a mountain ridge from southwest to northeast from the  Middle Rhine opposite the Bingen Forest to the Wetterau before Bad Nauheim for a distance of 75 kilometres; its average widths being only 4 to 5 km. The narrowest point on the ridge is only 2.4 km and is located on the heights of the Saalburg. At 7 km, the widest part of the natural region lies between  Presberg and Rüdesheim am Rhein. From the Main-Taunus Plain (ca. ) in the south the ridge zone climbs rapidly and steeply to over 600 to 879 m, and rises above the plain by 400 to 600 metres (m). To the north the Taunus ridge descends steeply but only around 200 to 300 m to the Lower Taunus.

The geological heart of the Taunus crest unit is formed by strata of Taunus quartzite several hundred metres thick. The very weather-resistant rock forms many of the peaks on the main ridge of the Taunus, such as the Großer Feldberg which, at 879 m is the highest mountain in the Taunus, but it also forms island-like mountains to the south such as the Hallgarter Zange, the Schläferskopf, the Kellerskopf and the Altkönig. In places, a parallel ridge has formed: along the Theißtal near Niedernhausen, which is bounded in the north and south by two lines of mountains.

Mountains 
The highest mountains in the High Taunus include the:

Name, (height in metres above sea level), location
 Großer Feldberg (879 m), Feldberg-Taunuskamm
 Kleiner Feldberg (825.2 m), Feldberg-Taunuskamm
 Altkönig (798.2 m), Feldberg-Taunuskamm
 Glaskopf (686.8 m), Feldberg-Taunuskamm
 Kolbenberg (684.0 m), Feldberg-Taunuskamm
 Klingenkopf (682.7 m), Feldberg-Taunuskamm
 Roßkopf (635–640 m), Feldberg-Taunuskamm
 Eichkopf (620.2 m), Feldberg-Taunuskamm
 Kalte Herberge (619.3 m), Rheingaugebirge
 Hohe Wurzel (617.9 m), Wiesbadener Hochtaunus

Settlements 

The settlements in or on the edge of the High Taunus include:

 Aulhausen
 Bärstadt
 Ehlhalten
 Eppenhain
 Georgenborn
 Glashütten
 Hausen vor der Höhe
 Hof Mappen
 Königshofen
 Niedernhausen
 Oberjosbach
 Ruppertshain
 Schlangenbad
 Schloßborn
 Seitzenhahn
 Stephanshausen
 Wambach

See also 
 Height of the Großer Feldberg

References

Literature 
 Reimer Hermann: Vergleichende Hydrogeographie des Taunus und seiner südlichen und südöstlichen Randgebiete, Wilhelm Schmitz Verlag, Gießen, 1965
 Alexander Stahr, Birgit Bender: Der Taunus – Eine Zeitreise, Stuttgart, 2007, 
 Eugen Ernst: Der Taunus – Ein L(i)ebenswertes Mittelgebirge, Frankfurt, 2009, 

Mountain ranges of Germany
Geography of Hesse